Red Flag is an Australian newspaper which is published bi-weekly by the Trotskyist organisation Socialist Alternative. It is associated with Red Flag radio podcast, produced by Roz Ward.

History
The first issue of Red Flag was published on 12 June 2013.

In July 2014, the newspaper was criticised after publishing an issue featured a front page depicting then Prime Minister of Australia Tony Abbott with a razor to his neck and the caption "One cut we'd like to see", in protest of the Abbott government's proposed budget cuts. In an interview, Abbott stated that the image "should not have any place in our public discourse". The editors refused to apologise and defended the cover as an homage to a 1977 poster and political slogan "Give Fraser the razor!", while accusing critics of hypocrisy for defending Abbott from a "clearly metaphorical" threat at the same time as his government was deporting refugees to face real threats of violence. They nonetheless withdrew the edition due to "legal concerns".

Particularly notable journalistic endeavours include coverage by Red Flag editor, Ben Hillier, of the 2019 democracy movement in Hong Kong. Ben Hillier's articles provided on-the-ground coverage of the siege and student rebellions at Hong Kong Polytechnic. Hillier's eyewitness account has been documented in his book, The Art of Rebellion: Dispatches from Hong Kong.

References

External links
 

Newspapers on Trove
Far-left politics in Australia
Newspapers published in Victoria (Australia)
Newspapers established in 2013
Socialist newspapers
2013 establishments in Australia